Aethalopteryx wiltshirei is a moth in the family Cossidae which is endemic to Saudi Arabia.

References

External links

Moths described in 2009
Endemic fauna of Saudi Arabia
Moths of Asia
Aethalopteryx